Anbjørn Ekeland (born 8 August 1947) is a Norwegian footballer. He played in three matches for the Norway national football team in 1971.

References

External links
 
 

1947 births
Living people
Norwegian footballers
Norway international footballers
Sportspeople from Stavanger
Association football defenders
Viking FK players